The 1938 College Football All-America team is composed of college football players who were selected as All-Americans by various organizations and writers that chose College Football All-America Teams in 1938. The nine selectors recognized by the NCAA as "official" for the 1938 season are (1) Collier's Weekly, as selected by Grantland Rice, (2) the Associated Press, (3) the United Press, (4) the All-America Board, (5) the International News Service (INS), (6) Liberty magazine, (7) the Newspaper Enterprise Association (NEA), (8) Newsweek, and (9) the Sporting News.
 
Four players were unanimous All-Americans on all of the major All-American teams: TCU quarterback (and 1938 Heisman Trophy winner) Davey O'Brien, Pittsburgh fullback Marshall Goldberg, Michigan guard Ralph Heikkinen and Notre Dame tackle Ed Beinor.

Consensus All-Americans
For the year 1938, the NCAA recognizes nine published All-American teams as "official" designations for purposes of its consensus determinations. The following chart identifies the NCAA-recognized consensus All-Americans and displays which first-team designations they received.

All-American selections for 1938

Ends
 Jerome H. Holland, Cornell (College Football Hall of Fame) (AP-1; NEA-2; NW; SN; ID-1)
 Bowden Wyatt, Tennessee (AAB; AP-2; CO-1; NEA-2; NYS-1)
 Waddy Young, Oklahoma (College Football Hall of Fame) (AP-1; CP-1; CO-1; NEA-1; NYS-1; WC-1; INS; LIB; NW; ID-1; DT; PW)
 Earl Brown, Notre Dame (AAB; AP-2; NEA-3; WC-1; LIB; ID-2; DT)
 Bill Daddio, Pittsburgh (UP-1; SN; AP-3)
 John Wysocki, Villanova (UP-1; CP-1; NEA-1; ID-2; PW)
 Howard Weiss, Wisconsin (NEA-2 [fullback]; INS; ID-1 [halfback])
 John Shirk, Oklahoma (NEA-3)
Sam Boyd, Baylor (AP-3)

Tackles
Ed Beinor, Notre Dame (AAB; AP-1; UP-1; CP-1; CO-1; NEA-1; NYS-1; WC-1; INS; LIB; NW; SN; ID-1; DT; PW); 
Alvord Wolff, Santa Clara (AP-1; UP-1; NEA-1; INS; NW; SN; ID-2; PW)
William McKeever, Cornell (CO-1; DT; AP-3)
A. Sidney Roth, Cornell (AP-2 [guard]; CO-1, (NYS-1) [guard])
I. B. Hale, TCU (AP-2; NEA-2; LIB; ID-1)
Bo Russell, Auburn (AP-2)
Bob Voigts, Northwestern (AAB; WC-1)
Joe Delaney, Holy Cross (NEA-3; NYS-1)
Steve Maronic, North Carolina (NEA-2; CP-1; AP-3)
Eddie Gatto, LSU (ID-2)
Joe Boyd, Texas A&M (NEA-3)

Guards
Ralph Heikkinen, Michigan (AAB; AP-1; UP-1; CP-1; CO-1; NEA-1; NYS-1; WC-1; INS; LIB; NW; SN; ID-2; DT; PW)
Ed Bock, Iowa State (College Football Hall of Fame) (AP-1; NEA-1; LIB; ID-2)
Bob Suffridge, Tennessee (UP-1; NEA-2; AP-3)
Frank Twedell, Minnesota (AP-2; NEA-2; INS; SN; ID-1; PW)
Harry Smith, USC (AAB; NEA-3; WC-1; NW; DT)
Gus Zitrides, Dartmouth (CP-1; ID-1)
Matt Landry, Rice (NEA-3)
Vaughn Lloyd, BYU (AP-3)

Centers
Ki Aldrich, TCU (College Football Hall of Fame) (AP-1; UP-1; CO-1; NEA-2; NYS-1; NW; SN; ID-2; DT)
Dan Hill, Duke (College Football Hall of Fame) (AAB; AP-2; CP-1; NEA-1; WC-1; INS; LIB; PW)
John Ryland, UCLA (AP-3)
Charles Brock, Nebraska (NEA-3; ID-1)

Quarterbacks
Davey O'Brien, TCU (College Football Hall of Fame) (AAB; AP-1; UP-1; CP-1; CO-1; NEA-1; NYS-1; WC-1; INS; LIB; NW; SN; ID-2; DT; PW)
Sid Luckman, Columbia (AP-2; SN)
George Cafego, Tennessee (College Football Hall of Fame) (AP-2; CP-1; NEA-1; LIB; ID-1; DT; PW)
Grenny Lansdell, USC (NEA-2) 
Everett Kischer, Iowa State (NEA-3)

Halfbacks
Bob MacLeod, Dartmouth (College Football Hall of Fame) (AAB; AP-3; CO-1; NEA-1; NYS-1; WC-1; INS; LIB; NW; ID-2; PW)
Vic Bottari, California (College Football Hall of Fame) (AAB; AP-2; CP-1; CO-1; NEA-2; WC-1; NW; SN; ID-1; DT)
Parker Hall, Ole Miss (College Football Hall of Fame) (AP-1; UP-1; NYS-1)
John Pingel, Michigan State (College Football Hall of Fame) (AP-1; NEA-2; INS; DT)
Eric Tipton, Duke (UP-1)
Billy Patterson, Baylor (AP-2)
Merl Condit, Carnegie Tech (ID-2)
Bill Osmanski, Holy Cross (ID-2)
Hugh McCullough, Oklahoma (NEA-3) 
Paul Christman, Missouri (NEA-3)
Warren Brunner, Tulane (AP-3)
Paul Shu, VMI (AP-3)
Howard Weiss, Wisconsin (AP-3)

Fullbacks
Marshall Goldberg, Pittsburgh (College Football Hall of Fame) (AAB; AP-1; UP-1; CP-1; CO-1; NEA-1; NYS-1; WC-1; INS; LIB; NW; SN; ID-1; PW)
John McLaughry, Brown (NEA-3)

Key
Bold = Consensus All-American
 -1 – First-team selection
 -2 – Second-team selection
 -3 – Third-team selection

Official selections
 AAB = All-America Board
 AP = Associated Press
 CO = Collier's Weekly, selected by Grantland Rice
 INS = International News Service
 LIB = Liberty magazine
 NEA = NEA Sports Syndicate
 NW = Newsweek
 SN = Sporting News
 UP = United Press

Other selections
 CP = Central Press Association, selected by the captains of more than 50 football teams across the country
 DT = Detroit Times by J.R. Gnau
 ID = Irving Dix
 NYS = New York Sun
 WC = Walter Camp Football Foundation
 AR = Albert Richard
 PW = Paul Williamson

See also
 1938 All-Big Six Conference football team
 1938 All-Big Ten Conference football team
 1938 All-Pacific Coast Conference football team
 1938 All-SEC football team

References

All-America Team
College Football All-America Teams